The Battle of Taillebourg, 21 July 1242 is an 1837 painting of the Battle of Taillebourg by Eugène Delacroix, one of 33 huge works commissioned from different artists by Louis-Philippe I for his Gallery of Battles at the Palace of Versailles, inaugurated in 1837. It still hangs there, between Horace Vernet's The Battle of Bouvines, 27 July 1214 and Charles-Philippe Larivière's The Battle of Mons-en-Pévèle, 18 August 1304. It is Delacroix's only work in the Gallery.

References

War paintings
Paintings by Eugène Delacroix
1837 paintings
Paintings in the collection of the Palace of Versailles
Horses in art